Stephen Tashjian (born 1959) is an American artist. His drag queen character Tabboo! became known in the East Village underground scene of New York City in the 1980s. He is also a puppeteer, painter, and singer.

Biography 
Stephen Tashjian was born in 1959 and raised in the central Massachusetts town of Leicester. He is from an Armenian American family. Tashjian attended the Massachusetts College of Art in Boston where he became friends with fellow students Nan Goldin and Jack Pierson.

He moved to New York's East Village in 1982 to pursue a career as an artist, and became a regular performer at the Pyramid Club, appearing next to other drag legends like Rupaul and Lady Bunny. Tashjian also performed several times at the annual Wigstock drag event, and appeared in Wigstock, The Movie, released in 1995. He also appeared as a contestant in Howard Stern's 1994 New Year's Rotten Eve Beauty Pageant. 

Tashjian has painted murals on city buildings and exhibited his paintings in many galleries internationally. Under the name Tabboo!, he designed flyers, record album covers and advertising for underground venues. One of his better known artworks is his graphic design for the album cover of Deee-Lite's World Clique. The curly lettering on the album cover became an iconic image for the band and the rave culture of the early 1990s.

The photographer Nan Goldin included photographs of Tabboo! in her books, and he is featured on the cover of her book The Other Side in drag.

Tashjian continues to perform in New York and shows his paintings in art shows, most notably a 2006 group show curated by Jack Pierson at Paul Kasmin Gallery in New York, featuring dozens of camp art pieces from his private collection. The show featured works by Matthew Barney, Nan Goldin, David Armstrong, Jack Pierson, and Mark Morrisroe.

Tashjian's work has also been documented in the New Museum's "East Village Show", and New York University (NYU)/Grey Art Gallery's "Downtown Show."

References

External links 
Stephen Tashjian, The Name of This Show is Not Gay Art, Paul Kasmin Gallery, Summer 2006

Living people
1959 births
Massachusetts College of Art and Design alumni
American drag queens
American puppeteers
20th-century American painters
American male painters
21st-century American painters
21st-century American male artists
American people of Armenian descent
People from Leicester, Massachusetts
People from the East Village, Manhattan
20th-century American male artists